Gail Smith may refer to:

 Gail Smith (classicist), American academic
 Gail Smith (journalist) (born 1955), Canadian television news anchor

See also
Gayle Smith, American governmental official
Gayle Smith Wilson (born 1967), American soccer player